1079 Life (callsign: 5RAM) is a Christian radio station in Adelaide, South Australia. 1079 Life broadcasts on the 107.9 MHz frequency.

History
1079 Life began broadcasting on October the 6th, 1993. But it was 20 years of preparation and planning before then that brought the dream into a reality. The station began broadcasting under the name "Alta Mira FM". Later it was renamed "Life FM".

In September 2016, Life FM rebranded and changed its name to "1079 Life", dropping the FM in the title in recognition of the emergence of digital radio, not just the FM band.

The station has been an incubator for local media talent in Adelaide, most notably Brenton Ragless and Kate Collins, who began with 1079 Life hosting the evening show. Bothare now with the Nine Network on their prime time news show.

Format
The station's motto is Life. Love. Adelaide.

Breakfast and Drive shows are both run as magazine programs with a sampling of the latest adult contemporary and Christian music breaking up the segments on news, opinion and lifestyle. There are also sport, music and talk programs throughout the week.

1079 Life won a SACBA award for Community Engagement in 2014.

The station has won 3 SANFL Media Awards, "Best Commentary" in 2004 & 2008 and "Best Radio Interview" in 2007. 1079 Life also simulcasts Nine News from 6pm weeknights.

Programming 
As of 2022, the featured on-air line-up consists of: 
 Adelaide's Good Taste Breakfast, hosted by Rebecca "Bec" Seabrooke and Zac Spencer from 6:00 am – 9:00 am weekdays
 Luke & Susie, hosted by Luke Holt and Susie Holt from 9:00 am – 12:00 pm weekdays
Afternoons on Life, hosted by Scott Curtis and Kit Densley in rotation from 12:00 pm – 3:00 pm weekdays
 Aiden in the Arvo hosted by Aiden Grant from 3:00 pm – 6:00 pm weekdays
 The Takeover hosted by Mary-Anne "Maz" Maio from 7:00 pm – 9:00 pm weekdays
Grassroots SA Sports show hosted by Andrew "Marksy" Marks and David "Hutts" Hutton on Saturday morning from 7:00 am - 10:00 am
Jodie and Pomfus hosted by Jodie Falco and Pete Scriven on Saturday morning from 10:00 am - 1:00 pm

Related stations
100.7 Riverland Life FM based in Loxton was formed with help from 1079 Life in Adelaide.

References

External links 
 

Radio stations in Adelaide
Christian radio stations in Australia
Community radio stations in Australia
Radio stations established in 1993
1993 establishments in Australia